Argininosuccinic acid is a non-proteinogenic amino acid that is an important intermediate in the urea cycle. It is a basic amino acid.

Reactions
Some cells synthesize argininosuccinic acid from citrulline and aspartic acid and use it as a precursor for arginine in the urea cycle or citrulline-NO cycle. The enzyme that catalyzes the reaction is argininosuccinate synthetase. 

Argininosuccinic acid is a precursor to fumarate in the citric acid cycle via argininosuccinate lyase.

Synonyms
Argininosuccinate

See also
 Succinic acid

References 

Basic amino acids
Guanidines
Dipeptides
Urea cycle